"The Music I Like" is a song by Italian singer Alexia, released in 1998 as the second single from her second album, The Party (1998). It is her sixth single overall and reached number one in Italy. A complete set of remixes for the UK market were issued which were later released in Italy.

Release
The track was initially released in Italy on maxi CD, 2 track CD and 12" before being released across mainland Europe. The UK lead remix of Alexia's previous single "Gimme Love" was a bonus track on the CD and 12" release. A limited edition 12" doublepack was released, the second disc containing some of the unreleased UK remixes of "Gimme Love".

A set of remixes were commissioned for the UK market, with the Metro Club Edit being placed on the UK version of The Party instead of the original. The Metro edit was also dubbed onto the video, yet despite this the video with the original version was rotated in the UK as well, with the original radio version being released as the lead UK radio edit. An additional set of remixes were made for the UK market by Trouser Enthusiasts and Almighty (who had done the UK version of "Uh La La La", with the Almighty mix having a soundalike sample from Stardust's "Music Sounds Better With You" which was the big dance hit of summer 1998. The remix was dubbed "Alexia Vs Stardust - Music Sounds Better With Alexia".

Following the UK release, a remix release was issued in Italy on both CD and 12" containing the new UK remixes along with a slower version entitled the 'US Radio Mix' even though the track was never released in America. The Australian release contained a mixture of original and UK remixes.

The standard Italian release was released digitally in 2006 and a further set of remixes (mainly those commissioned for the UK market) were released in 2015 including two dub remixes by Metro and Trouser Enthusiasts that were never released on commercial or promotional copies.

Music video
A music video was produced to promote the single. The video was edited to both the Original Version in the UK, and the Metro Club Edit.

Official versions

Radio Version 3:23
Extended Version 6:18
Rob Club Mix 6:03
Radio PM Project in Ibiza 3:59
Extended PM Project in Ibiza 7:08
D-Bop's Thank You For The Music Mix 7:32
US Radio Mix 3:33
Metro Club Edit 3:18
Metro Club Mix 5:46

Metro's Rhythm Of Life Dub 6:19
Xenomania Club Mix 5:45
Colour System Inc Classic Vocal 6:50
Colour System Inc Amber Dub 7:15
Almighty Funky Disco Edit 3:1012
Almighty Funky Disco Mix 7:0712
Trouser Enthusiasts Dead Glamorous Mix 7:44
Trouser Enthusiasts Painkiller dub 10:20

1 These mixes were dubbed "Alexia Vs Stardust"
2 Unreleased, only available on white label promos

Charts

References

1998 singles
Alexia (Italian singer) songs
Eurodance songs
Songs written by Roberto Zanetti
Songs written by Alexia (Italian singer)
Sony Music singles
1998 songs
Number-one singles in Italy